Lauritz Bernhard Sirevaag (15 March 1926, Stavanger – 2016) was a Norwegian politician for the Conservative Party.

On the local level he was a member of Sandnes city council from 1963 to 1971, serving as mayor from 1967 to 1969. He was elected to the Norwegian Parliament from Rogaland in 1969, and was re-elected on one occasion. From 1991 to 1999 he was a member of Rogaland county council.

Sirevaag worked for many years as a banker. He also chaired Bryne FK. He died in 2016.

References

1926 births
2016 deaths
People from Sandnes
Members of the Storting
Conservative Party (Norway) politicians
Mayors of places in Rogaland
Norwegian bankers
Norwegian sports executives and administrators
20th-century Norwegian politicians